is an action role-playing video game published by Namco and developed by XPEC Entertainment for the PlayStation Portable, released in 2006.

The plot revolves around a group of intergalactic mercenaries, known as the Bounty Hounds, led by Maximilian (the playable character), on a mission to eradicate the indigenous lifeforms of alien planets, so the human race may colonize them. In the course of it, they unravel a conspiracy among the most powerful corporations on Earth.

Gameplay

The gameplay is a mix of hack and slash and role-playing video game, with some elements of third-person shooter. The player is able to find and equip over 500 weapons, and even more pieces of armor. Using experiences points gained by killing the enemies, the player is able to upgrade Maximilian's stats and earn skills.

Reception

Bounty Hounds received "mixed" reviews according to video game review aggregator Metacritic.  In Japan, Famitsu gave it a score of one eight, one seven, one six, and one eight, for a total of 29 out of 40.

References

External links

2006 video games
Namco games
PlayStation Portable games
PlayStation Portable-only games
Role-playing video games
Third-person shooters
Video games developed in Taiwan